Wyoming Highway 240 (WYO 240) is a  state road that in Lincoln County, Wyoming that connects U.S. Route 30 (US 30) and US 189 in the southeastern end of the county.

Route description
WYO 240 Acts as a bypass for travelers connecting from US 30 west to US 189 north.

Major intersections

References

Official 2003 State Highway Map of Wyoming

External links 

Wyoming State Routes
WYO 240 - US 189 to US 30

Transportation in Lincoln County, Wyoming
240